Paul Mario Day (born 19 April 1956) is a British singer, who was the original lead vocalist of Iron Maiden from 1975 to 1976. Furthermore he is a video-producer and a designer. Recently he is reported to live in Newcastle, New South Wales.

Iron Maiden
Day was the first lead singer for Iron Maiden from  December 1975 to October 1976. On the Iron Maiden The Early Days DVD it was mentioned that Day was fired because he did not have enough stage charisma. He was replaced by Dennis Wilcock. Years later he claimed co-authorship of the Iron Maiden song "Strange World".

Further activities 
He later formed a band called More that played at the Donington Monsters of Rock Festival in 1981, and also had onetime Iron Maiden guitarist Paul Todd and Def Leppard drummer Frank Noone in the line-up. He was lead singer of Wildfire in 1983 to 1984. In 1985 the Sweet were re-formed by Andy Scott and Mick Tucker then featuring Paul Day. He recorded a live album at the Marquee Club in London as lead singer of Sweet in 1986. After this engagement he has lived in Australia since 1986 and is the lead vocalist of two bands from Newcastle, New South Wales. He has performed covers of rock songs with the band Defaced and sang and wrote for Crimzon Lake, now disbanded, an unsigned hard rock band. Currently he is in contact with the Australian progressive metal band Buffalo Crows in appearance as a guest musician. He is still claimed to be a New Wave of British Heavy Metal-Style musician.

In 2013, Paul Day recorded vocals for a jingle for Canberra Toyota, a Toyota car dealership located in Canberra, Australian Capital Territory.

Trivia 
42 years after Iron Maiden had been formed the original 1975-line-up by Steve Harris met in London at 29 December. Only the former drummer Ron Matthews was absent, but Paul Mario Day (vocals), Dave Sullivan and Terry Rance (guitars) appeared.

Discography

More 
Atlantic:
 Warhead, 1981
Blood & Thunder, 1982
Fire, (Single) 1981
We Are The Band, 1981
Trickster (7"), 1982

Wildfire 
Mausoleum Records:
 Brute Force And Ignorance, 1983
 Summer Lightning, 1983
 Jerusalem (7", Single), 1984
 Nothing Lasts Forever (7"), 1984

The Sweet 
 live at Marquee, see: https://www.youtube.com/watch?v=Bghtzail-5E

Crimson Lake 
 Crimzon Lake (CD, EP), Not On Label (Crimzon Lake), 2011

Buffalo Crows 
 Buffalo Crows (with Paul Mario Day) - Defenders, LP 'Bovonic Empires'; see: https://www.youtube.com/watch?v=KCN8DnuOm7A

Compilation 
 Brute Force & Ignorance + Summer Lightning (2xCD, Comp), Golden Core, 2020
 Guilty; Various - Cart & Horses The Birthplace Of Iron Maiden - Wasted Year 2020 (CD, Comp); Not on Label; 2021

References

External links
 Paul Mario Day's website, asian letters used, unreadable for european users
 History of Wildfire

1956 births
Iron Maiden members
English heavy metal singers
English rock singers
English male singers
Living people
People from Whitechapel